The Conan Chronicles: Volume 2: The Hour of the Dragon is a collection of fantasy short stories written by Robert E. Howard featuring his sword and sorcery hero Conan the Barbarian.  The book was published in 2001 by Gollancz as sixteenth volume of their Fantasy Masterworks series.  The book, edited by Stephen Jones, presents the stories in their internal chronological order.  Most of the stories originally appeared in the magazines Weird Tales, Fantasy Magazine and The Howard Collector.

Contents

 Map of the Hyborian Age, by Dave Senior
 Notes on Various Peoples of the Hyborian Age
 "Red Nails"
 "Jewels of Gwahlur"
 "Beyond the Black River"
 "The Black Stranger"
 "Wolves Beyond the Border" (Draft)
 "The Phoenix on the Sword"
 "The Scarlet Citadel"
 "The Hour of the Dragon" (poem)
 "The Hour of the Dragon"
 "Cimmeria"
 Afterword: Robert E. Howard and Conan: The Final Years, by Stephen Jones

References

2001 short story collections
Fantasy short story collections
Conan the Barbarian books
Victor Gollancz Ltd books

fr:Conan : L'Heure du dragon